The Akaki is a river of central Oromia, Ethiopia. It is a tributary of the Awash River on the right side.

Two smaller rivers join the Akaki at the Aba-Samuel reservoir.  These two rivers are the Little Akaki and the Great Akaki; the former is on the western side of the Akaki and the latter on the east.

Pollution
The city of Addis Ababa has made the Akaki its waste disposal site. This puts the rural population living in the fringes of the city at risk since the Akaki is a source of drinking water for them.

Avifauna
The Akaki is vital for numerous bird species. The Akaki–Aba-Samuel wetlands have been identified by the Birdlife International as a crucial staging ground for winter migratory bird species. The wetlands have been known to support as many as 20,000 water birds.

See also 
 List of rivers of Ethiopia

References

Awash River
Rivers of Ethiopia
Ethiopian Highlands
Geography of Oromia Region